Patrick Kifu Apataki (born 14 May 1979) is a DR Congo former professional footballer who played as a striker. He spent most of his career in South Africa and Angola.

Club career
Apataki was born in Kinshasa, Zaire. He played for AmaZulu, FC Rouen, RCF Paris, AS Marsa, CS Sfaxien, Bursaspor, Lokeren, DC Motema Pembe. He was released by Mamelodi Sundowns at the end of the 2007–08 season, attended trials at Israeli club Bnei Sakhnin F.C. in August, but complications with travel documents appear to have scuppered his return to that country has been interest in his services from Premiership rookies Bay United. The Congolese striker believed his decision to join struggling First Division side Dynamos will boost his chances of a return to the Absa Premiership or a move overseas. In 2009 left Dynamos of the South African Premier Soccer League and joined to F.C. Cape Town.

International career
Apataki was also member of the DR Congo national team.

References

External links
 Profile and stats – Lokeren

1979 births
Living people
Footballers from Kinshasa
Association football forwards
Democratic Republic of the Congo footballers
Democratic Republic of the Congo international footballers
Bursaspor footballers
CS Sfaxien players
AS Marsa players
Daring Club Motema Pembe players
Estrela Clube Primeiro de Maio players
F.C. Cape Town players
FC Rouen players
K.S.C. Lokeren Oost-Vlaanderen players
Mamelodi Sundowns F.C. players
Racing Club de France Football players
Dynamos F.C. (South Africa) players
Democratic Republic of the Congo expatriate footballers
Democratic Republic of the Congo expatriate sportspeople in Angola
Democratic Republic of the Congo expatriate sportspeople in Belgium
Democratic Republic of the Congo expatriate sportspeople in France
Democratic Republic of the Congo expatriate sportspeople in Israel
Democratic Republic of the Congo expatriate sportspeople in South Africa
Democratic Republic of the Congo expatriate sportspeople in Tunisia
Democratic Republic of the Congo expatriate sportspeople in Turkey
Expatriate soccer players in South Africa
Expatriate footballers in Angola
Expatriate footballers in France
Expatriate footballers in Tunisia
Expatriate footballers in Turkey
Expatriate footballers in Belgium